Ian Edmund Joseph Moutray (2 July 1936 – 17 July 2014) was a rugby union player who represented Australia.

Moutray, an inside centre, was born in Ryde, New South Wales and claimed 3 international rugby caps for Australia. He was educated at Fort Street Boys High School and graduated from Sydney University. He played club rugby for Drummoyne in an era when it was a leading club.

References

Australian rugby union players
Australia international rugby union players
1936 births
2014 deaths
Rugby union players from Sydney
Rugby union centres